Rabi`a may refer to:
Rabi`ah, an Arab tribe

Rābiʻa (رابعه) may refer to:

Rabia al-Adawiyya, 8th-century Muslim Sufi saint
Rabi'a Balkhi, Persian poet